The Campeonato Brasileiro Série C is the third tier of the Brazilian football league system.

Unlike the first and second divisions, the Série C is not played in a double round robin system, arguably because many participating teams lack the financial conditions to travel long distances. Thus, the tournament is organized in regional groups and the table prevents teams from distant states from playing each other in the initial rounds.

Until 2008, any professional team could apply, but only 64 teams would take part in the tournament. The teams that had been relegated from the Série B in the previous year were joined by teams qualified for each federation state. Qualification rules varied, some federations used the state tournaments as qualification tournaments, others organized exclusive qualification tournaments to the Série C.

Beginning in 2009, the Série C was reduced from 64 teams to 20 and the new Campeonato Brasileiro Série D is the qualifier for Brazilian league football. In its current format the 20 teams are divided into two groups and each team plays all opponents from its own group on a home and away basis. The top four teams in each group qualify for a knock out stage and the four semi-finalists are promoted to the Campeonato Brasileiro Série B. The bottom two teams of each group are relegated to the Campeonato Brasileiro Série D.

History and past champions

Official champions
The Campeonato Brasileiro has existed since 1971. However, there have been many years when no third division tournament took place. In most cases it was because the two elite divisions had too many clubs (in 1989, for instance, 96 teams contested the second division). The following table shows the winners and runners-up of the Série C tournaments played from 1981, according to the Brazilian Football Confederation:

Unofficial champions

The following season is not officially recognized by the CBF:

Titles by team

Titles by state

Participations

Most appearances

Below is the list of clubs that have more appearances in the Campeonato Brasileiro Série C.

See also
 Campeonato Brasileiro Série A, the main division of Brazilian football
 Campeonato Brasileiro Série B, the second division of Brazilian football
 Campeonato Brasileiro Série D, the fourth division of Brazilian football

References

External links
 CBF Confederação Brasileira de Futebol - Brazilian Football Confederation
 RSSSF Brazil links

 
3
3
Brazil
Professional sports leagues in Brazil